The 1961–62 Oberliga  was the seventeenth season of the Oberliga, the first tier of the football league system in West Germany. The league operated in five regional divisions, Berlin, North, South, Southwest and West. The five league champions and the runners-up from the west, south, southwest and north then entered the 1962 German football championship which was won by 1. FC Köln. It was 1. FC Köln's first-ever national championship.

Hamburger SV equaled the Oberliga start record set in 1952–53 by 1. FC Köln and repeated by Hannover 96 the season after, winning its first eleven games, a mark never surpassed.

A similar league, the DDR-Oberliga, existed in East Germany, set at the first tier of the East German football league system. The 1961–62 DDR-Oberliga was won by ASK Vorwärts Berlin.

Oberliga Nord
The 1961–62 season saw two new clubs in the league, Bremer SV and Eintracht Nordhorn, both promoted from the Amateurliga. The league's top scorers were Uwe Seeler (Hamburger SV) and Gerd Koll (Holstein Kiel) with 28 goals each.

Oberliga Berlin
The 1961–62 season saw one new club in the league, Union 06 Berlin, promoted from the Amateurliga Berlin. The league's top scorers were Wolfgang Seeger (Tennis Borussia Berlin) and Lutz Steinert (Hertha BSC) with 18 goals each.

Oberliga West
The 1961–62 season saw two new clubs in the league, Fortuna Düsseldorf and Schwarz-Weiß Essen, both promoted from the 2. Oberliga West. The league's top scorer was Manfred Rummel of Schwarz-Weiß Essen with 26 goals.

Oberliga Südwest
The 1961–62 season saw two new clubs in the league, BSC Oppau and VfR Kaiserslautern, both promoted from the 2. Oberliga Südwest. The league's top scorer was Rudi Dörrenbächer of Borussia Neunkirchen with 37 goals, the highest total for any scorer in the five Oberligas in 1961–62.

Oberliga Süd
The 1961–62 season saw two new clubs in the league, BC Augsburg and Schwaben Augsburg, both promoted from the 2. Oberliga Süd. The league's top scorer was Lothar Schämer of Eintracht Frankfurt with 26 goals.

German championship

The 1962 German football championship was contested by the nine qualified Oberliga teams and won by 1. FC Köln, defeating 1. FC Nürnberg in the final. The runners-up of the Oberliga Nord and West played a pre-qualifying match. The remaining eight clubs then played a home-or-away round in two groups of four. The two group winners then advanced to the final.

Qualifying

|}

Group 1

Group 2

Final

|}

References

Sources
 30 Jahre Bundesliga  30th anniversary special, publisher: kicker Sportmagazin, published: 1993
 kicker-Almanach 1990  Yearbook of German football, publisher: kicker Sportmagazin, published: 1989, 
 DSFS Liga-Chronik seit 1945  publisher: DSFS, published: 2005
 100 Jahre Süddeutscher Fußball-Verband  100 Years of the Southern German Football Federation, publisher: SFV, published: 1997

External links
 The Oberligas on Fussballdaten.de 

1961-62
1
Ger